Benthochromis melanoides is a species of fish in the family Cichlidae. It is endemic to the deep waters of Lake Tanganyika, where it lives in deep water and feeds on plankton and crustaceans.

References

melanoides
Taxa named by Max Poll
Taxonomy articles created by Polbot
Fish described in 1984